Murraytrematoides is a genus of monopisthocotylean monogeneans in the family Diplectanidae.

Species of this genus are parasite on Perciformes and Anguilliformes marine fish. 
The genus Geneticoenteron Yamaguti, 1958  was considered a synonym of Murraytrematoides by Oliver.

Species
According to the World Register of Marine Species, species include:

 Murraytrematoides bychowskii (Nagibina, 1976) Oliver, 1987 
 Murraytrematoides ditrematis Yamaguti, 1958  (Type-species)
 Murraytrematoides kuhliae Yamaguti, 1968 
 Murraytrematoides lateolabracis (Yamaguti, 1958) Oliver, 1987

References

Diplectanidae
Monogenea genera
Parasites of fish